Luigi Fratangelo (born 14 July 1958) is an Australian weightlifter. He competed in the men's middle heavyweight event at the 1980 Summer Olympics.

References

External links
 

1958 births
Living people
Australian male weightlifters
Olympic weightlifters of Australia
Weightlifters at the 1980 Summer Olympics
Place of birth missing (living people)
Commonwealth Games medallists in weightlifting
Commonwealth Games silver medallists for Australia
Weightlifters at the 1986 Commonwealth Games
20th-century Australian people
21st-century Australian people
Medallists at the 1986 Commonwealth Games